During 1954-55 season Associazione Calcio Milan competed in Serie A and Coppa Latina.

Summary 
Aimed with the goals of Gunnar Nordahl and the arrival of uruguayan Juan Alberto Schiaffino from Peñarol, the team clinched its domestic title. Manager Béla Guttman was fired in February replaced by Uruguayan Hector Puricelli in a move to boost the players moral being crucial to win the championship.

Squad 

 (Captain)

 (vice-Captain)

Transfers

Competitions

Serie A

League table

Matches

Latin Cup

Semifinals

Final 3º/4º place

Statistics

Player statistics

= Appearances 
20.Eros Beraldo 
33.Mario Bergamaschi 
33.Lorenzo Buffon 
13.Alfio Fontana 
28.Amleto Frignani 
29.Nils Liedholm 
28.Cesare Maldini 
35.Gunnar Nordahl 
12.Franco Pedroni 
28.Eduardo Ricagni 
28.Juan Alberto Schiaffino 
27.Arturo Silvestri 
31.Jørgen Leschly Sørensen 
1.Omero Tognon 
3.Riccardo Toros 
7.Valentino Valli 
3.Albano Vicariotto 
1.Sandro Vitali 
26.Francesco Zagatti

Goalscorers
28.Gunnar Nordahl 
15.Juan Alberto Schiaffino 
14.Jørgen Leschly Sørensen 
8.Eduardo Ricagni 
7.Amleto Frignani 
7.Nils Liedholm 
3.Albano Vicariotto 
1.Mario Bergamaschi 
1.Cesare Maldini 
1.Valentino Valli

References

External links 

A.C. Milan seasons
Milan
Italian football championship-winning seasons